Ebang may be,

Ebang language
Ebang Palace

People
Marcellin Mve Ebang
Didier Ovono Ebang
Eric Ebang Zué